Julio César Cadena (born 29 August 1963) is a Colombian former racing cyclist. He rode in ten Grand Tours between 1987 and 1994.

Major results
1984
 1st  Overall Tour de Guadeloupe
1986
 1st  Overall Ronde de l'Isard
1990
 1st Stage 3 GP Internacional de Café
1991
 10th Overall Vuelta a Andalucía
1992
 1st Stage 10 Vuelta a España

Grand Tour general classification results timeline

References

External links

1963 births
Living people
Colombian male cyclists
People from Cundinamarca Department
Colombian Vuelta a España stage winners
20th-century Colombian people